Kluyveromyces is a genus of ascomycetous yeasts in the family Saccharomycetaceae. Some of the species, such as K. marxianus, are the teleomorphs of Candida species.

The genus name of Kluyveromyces is in honour of Albert Jan Kluyver ForMemRS (1888-1956), who was a Dutch microbiologist and biochemist.

The genus was circumscribed by Johannes P. Van der Walt in Antonie van Leeuwenhoek vol.22 on pages 268-271 in 1956.

Species
Kluyveromyces is widely cultured for microbiological en genetic research. Some important species include:

 Kluyveromyces lactis

 Kluyveromyces marxianus
 Kluyveromyces thermotolerans

See also 
Yeast in winemaking

References 

Saccharomycetaceae
Yeasts
Yeasts used in brewing